Sennariolo is a comune (municipality) located about  northwest of Cagliari and about  north of Oristano in the Province of Oristano, Sardinia, Italy.

Sennariolo borders the following municipalities: Cuglieri, Flussio, Scano di Montiferro, Tresnuraghes.

Demographic evolution

References

Cities and towns in Sardinia